LG Lotus (LX600) is a phone Introduced on September 10, 2008. The phone is marketed as a fashion forward device by Sprint Nextel. It was designed by fashion designer Christian V. Siriano.

The LG Lotus has enhanced messaging features including a wide display screen and a
full QWERTY keyboard. It is available exclusively through Sprint.

Features
 QWERTY Keyboard
 External music controls
 2.0-megapixel camera and camcorder
 Bluetooth-capable
 microSDTM Memory Port

A scarf was also designed by Siriano to complement the phone. The scarf features a pocket specifically tailored to fit the LG Lotus.

References

External links
LG Lotus Product Page

Lotus
Mobile phones introduced in 2008